At the 1960 Summer Olympics, 16 wrestling events were contested, all for men.  There were eight weight classes in Greco-Roman wrestling and eight classes in freestyle wrestling.

Medal table

Medal summary

Greco-Roman

Freestyle

Participating nations

A total of 324 wrestlers from 46 nations competed at the Rome Games:

See also
List of World and Olympic Champions in men's freestyle wrestling
List of World and Olympic Champions in Greco-Roman wrestling

References

External links
Official Olympic Report

 
1960 Summer Olympics events
1960